Avitohol (153?–453?) is the first name in the Nominalia of the Bulgarian khans. Little is known about him. According to the document he is from the Dulo clan and most probably was considered and respected as the forefather of the khans.
Some researchers claim that Avitohol is Attila the Hun who was succeeded by his son Ernak or Irnik (the second name mentioned in the Nominalia). Others suggests that Avitohol was a semi-legendary ruler who may have been either a descendant or an ancestor of Attila (see Dulo clan).

Etymology 
The very name Avitohol, according to the interpretation of the economic historian Dobrev, done with the help of the Pamiric languages, means "Son of the Deer" (from Avi - deer, "Tohol" - child). [2] This interpretation is rejected by the linguist-turkist Prof. Ivan Dobrev as insubstantial, [3] because the word "tochol" is a relatively late Arabic loan (طفل, [tifl] "nursing") in the Pamiric languages. His proposed interpretation of the name is avit-ohol, from the old Iranian pati- "gentleman, chief, lord; ruler, khan, and the old oğul, from the old Turkic oğul- "son, child". In fact, Dobrev repeats entirely the earlier opinion of J. Mykola and H. Houssig that Avitohol originates from the Hunno-Altai avit (ata), aba - ancestor (father, grandfather) and ogul - son, a descendant whose proto-Bulgarian form is ohol. So thinks B. Simeonov. The imaginary link with Atila is derived as an ata - father + il - tribe, i.e. Attila, in old Turkic: father of the tribe.

Honours
Avitohol Point on Livingston Island in the South Shetland Islands, Antarctica is named "after the legendary Khan Avitohol listed in the 8th Century Nominalia of the Bulgarian Khans, who laid the foundations of the Bulgarian statehood in AD 165."

A super computer is named after Avitohol. It is managed by the Institute of Information and Communication Technologies from Bulgarian Academy of Sciences. The installation is below the Institute of Mathematics and Informatics

See also
 Nominalia of the Bulgarian khans
 Bulgars
 Huns
 Attila the Hun

Notes

Monarchs of the Bulgars
Ancient Bulgars
Huns
Dulo clan